Mariusz Zasada (born September 8, 1982) is a Polish footballer who plays as a left winger for Miedź Legnica.

Career

Club
In July 2010, he was loaned to Górnik Łęczna on a one-year deal.
He was released from Polonia Warsaw on 22 June 2011.

In July 2011, he joined Miedź Legnica.

References

External links
 

Polish footballers
Stal Głowno players
ŁKS Łódź players
Tur Turek players
Polonia Warsaw players
Górnik Łęczna players
Miedź Legnica players
1982 births
Living people
Footballers from Łódź
Association football midfielders